The Haifa derby is the name given to the football matches between Hapoel Haifa and Maccabi Haifa. As with any major football rivalry, gloating and banter between the two sets of fans is commonplace.

This rivalry between those two club has a long history, just like the clubs themselves. Hapoel Haifa was associated with the Israeli Labor Party and a socialist point of view, while Maccabi Haifa was known for middle class fans. In recent years these political differences have almost completely disappeared due to Maccabi becoming big club by winning twelve titles since 1984 compared with Hapoel's sole title, which it won in 1999. This can be further evidenced by Hapoel's opening fixture at Sammy Ofer Stadium attracting 3,500 fans while Maccabi's inaugural fixture was a full capacity 30,000.

Full list of results

IFA League
Before the establishment of the state of Israel, both teams played in the first completed league season, meeting twice during the season. However, Maccabi Haifa withdrew from the next season and didn't return to the top division until gaining promotion from Liga Bet in 1947. The teams met once more at the beginning of the following season, which was abandoned due the outbreak of the Israeli war for independence. The league was resumed in 1949 with both clubs in the top division.

Israel State Cup

Toto Cup

Other Competitions

Statistics 

As of 20 May 2022

Goalscorer records
Players with 5 or more goals in the 
Those in bold still with either side.

Teams League Position

Honours

Notes

References

 
 

Football derbies in Israel
Hapoel Haifa F.C.
Maccabi Haifa F.C.
Football in Israel